The eighth series of Love Island was broadcast from 6 June 2022 to 1 August 2022 on ITV2 with Laura Whitmore presenting the series and Iain Stirling narrating.

The series featured cameo appearances from singer Becky Hill, who appeared during a party in the villa performing songs including "Crazy What Love Can Do", as well as DJ Joel Corry, who performed during a VIP party. Alfie Boe also made an appearance to perform during a date. On 1 August 2022, the series was won by Ekin-Su Cülcüloğlu and Davide Sanclimenti with 63.7% of the final vote. Gemma Owen and Luca Bish finished as runners-up. 

The 'split or steal' element was cut from the eighth series finale for the first time in the show's history. With 'split or steal,' the winners are presented with two sealed envelopes, one that's empty and one that contains a £50k prize. In previous seasons, the person who received the money was asked if they wanted to 'steal' it or 'split' it with their partner. In series eight, the winning couple automatically shared the prize money. ITV2 did not officially comment as to why they did away with the 'split or steal' element.

Production
During the final of the previous series on 23 August 2021, it was announced that the show would return for an eighth series the following year. The series this time was filmed in a new villa in Mallorca, making it the first time since the third series the show has moved to a new location, excluding the winter series that was filmed in South Africa. The first teaser trailer aired on 6 May 2022, a month before the show's launch with several more trailers being released in the following weeks, featuring cartoon animations and tag lines from the show. It was also announced that the contestants would wear second-hand clothes for the first time, following the show's partnership with eBay, with bosses trying to aim for a "more eco-friendly production."

Featured locations
The main villa was Sa Vinyassa in Sant Llorenç des Cardassar, Casa Amor was the nearby Alchemy Villa, and the Vibe Club was the Shiva Beach Club in Llucmajor.

Islanders
The original Islanders for the eighth series were announced on 30 May 2022, one week before the series launch. For the first time in the show's history, the series featured a returning contestant, with Adam Collard having previously appeared in the fourth series.

For the first time, Love Island included a deaf islander.  Tasha Ghouri is a dancer and model, who wears a cochlear implant.

Coupling
For the first time in the show's history, the original couples were decided by the voting public. On 2 June, four days before the launch, a vote opened on the app for viewers to decide which boy each girl should couple up with. 

{| class="wikitable nowrap" style="text-align:center; font-size:90%; line-height:15px; width:100%"
! style="width:8%"| 
! style="width:8%"| Day 1
! style="width:8%"| Day 5
! style="width:8%"| Day 12
! style="width:8%"| Day 18
! style="width:8%"| Day 23
! style="width:8%"| Day 31
! style="width:8%"| Day 38
! style="width:8%"| Day 47
! style="width:10%"| Final
|-
! colspan="12" style="background:#000" |
|-
! Davide
| 
| Ekin-Su
| Gemma
| Antigoni
| Ekin-Su
| Ekin-Su
| Ekin-Su
| Ekin-Su
| style="background:#FBF373"|Winner  (Day 58) 
|-
! Ekin-Su
| style="background:#fff;" |Not inVilla
| Davide
| Jay
| Charlie
| Davide
| Davide
| Davide
| Davide
| style="background:#FBF373"|Winner  (Day 58) 
|-
! Gemma
| Liam
| Luca
| Davide
| Luca
| Luca
| Luca
| Luca
| Luca
| style="background:#FBF373"|Runner-up  (Day 58) 
|-
! Luca
| Paige
| Gemma
| Danica
| Gemma
| Gemma
| Gemma
| Gemma
| Gemma
| style="background:#FBF373"|Runner-up  (Day 58) 
|-
! Dami
| Amber
| Amber
| Amber
| Indiyah
| Indiyah
| Summer
| Indiyah
| Indiyah
| style="background:#FBF373"|Third place  (Day 58)
|-
! Indiyah
| Ikenna
| Ikenna
| Ikenna
| Dami
| Dami
| Deji
| Dami
| Dami
| style="background:#FBF373"|Third place  (Day 58) 
|-
! Andrew
| Tasha
| Tasha
| Tasha
| Tasha
| Tasha
| Coco
| Tasha
| Tasha
| style="background:#FBF373"|Fourth place  (Day 58)
|-
! Tasha
| Andrew
| Andrew
| Andrew
| Andrew
| Andrew
| Billy
| Andrew
| Andrew
| style="background:#FBF373"|Fourth place  (Day 58)
|-
! Adam
| colspan="6" style="background:#fff;" |Not in Villa
| Paige
| Paige
| style="background:salmon;"|Dumped(Day 56) 
|-
! Paige
| Luca
| 
| Jacques
| Jay
| Jacques
| Jacques
| Adam
| Adam
| style="background:salmon;"|Dumped(Day 56)  
|-
! Danica
| colspan="2" style="background:#fff;" |Not in Villa
| Luca
| Jacques
| Jay
| Josh
| Billy
| Jamie 
| style="background:salmon;"|Dumped(Day 51) 
|-
! Jamie
| colspan="7" style="background:#fff;" |Not in Villa
| Danica
| style="background:salmon;"|Dumped(Day 51)
|-
! Deji
| colspan="5" style="background:#fff;" |Not in Villa
| Indiyah
| Coco
| Lacey
| style="background:salmon;"|Dumped(Day 49)
|-
! Lacey
| colspan="7" style="background:#fff;" |Not in Villa
| Deji
| style="background:salmon;"|Dumped(Day 49)
|-
! Nathalia
| colspan="7" style="background:#fff;" |Not in Villa
| Reece
| style="background:salmon;"|Dumped(Day 49)
|-
! Reece
| colspan="7" style="background:#fff;" |Not in Villa
| Nathalia
| style="background:salmon;"|Dumped(Day 49)
|-
! Billy
| colspan="5" style="background:#fff;" |Not in Villa
| Tasha
| Danica
| colspan="2" style="background:salmon;"|Dumped(Day 44)
|-
! Summer
| colspan="5" style="background:#fff;" |Not in Villa
| Dami
| Josh
| colspan="2" style="background:salmon;"|Dumped(Day 44)
|-
! Coco
| colspan="5" style="background:#fff;" |Not in Villa
| Andrew
| Deji
| colspan="2" style="background:salmon;"|Dumped(Day 39)
|-
! Josh
| colspan="5" style="background:#fff;" |Not in Villa
| Danica
| Summer
| colspan="2" style="background:salmon;"|Dumped(Day 39)
|-
! Jacques
| colspan="2" style="background:#fff;" |Not in Villa
| Paige
| Danica
| Paige
| Paige
| colspan="3" style="background:#FCF" |Walked (Day 37)
|-
! Chyna
| colspan="5" style="background:#fff;" |Not in Villa
| Jay
| colspan="4" style="background:salmon;"|Dumped(Day 35)
|-
! Jay
| colspan="2" style="background:#fff;" |Not in Villa
| Ekin-Su
| Paige
| Danica
| Chyna
| colspan="4" style="background:salmon;"|Dumped(Day 35)
|-
! Cheyanne
| colspan="5" style="background:#fff;" |Not in Villa
| colspan="4" style="background:salmon;"|Dumped(Day 31)
|-
! George
| colspan="5" style="background:#fff;" |Not in Villa
| colspan="4" style="background:salmon;"|Dumped(Day 31)
|-
! Jack
| colspan="5" style="background:#fff;" |Not in Villa
| colspan="4" style="background:salmon;"|Dumped(Day 31)
|-
! Jazmine
| colspan="5" style="background:#fff;" |Not in Villa
| colspan="4" style="background:salmon;"|Dumped(Day 31)
|-
! Mollie
| colspan="5" style="background:#fff;" |Not in Villa
| colspan="4" style="background:salmon;"|Dumped(Day 31)
|-
! Samuel
| colspan="5" style="background:#fff;" |Not in Villa
| colspan="4" style="background:salmon;"|Dumped(Day 31)
|-
! Antigoni
| colspan="3" style="background:#fff;" |Not in Villa
| Davide
| Charlie
| colspan="4" style="background:salmon;"|Dumped(Day 25)
|-
! Charlie
| colspan="3" style="background:#fff;" |Not in Villa
| Ekin-Su
| Antigoni
| colspan="4" style="background:salmon;"|Dumped(Day 25)
|-
! Amber
| Dami
| Dami
| Dami
| colspan="6" style="background:salmon;"|Dumped(Day 15)
|-
! Ikenna
| Indiyah
| Indiyah
| Indiyah
| colspan="6" style="background:salmon;"|Dumped(Day 15)
|-
! Remi
| colspan="2" style="background:#fff;" |Not in Villa
| colspan="7" style="background:salmon;"|Dumped(Day 12)
|-
! Afia
| colspan="1" style="background:#fff;" |Not inVilla
|
| colspan="7" style="background:salmon;"|Dumped(Day 8)
|-
! Liam
| Gemma
| colspan="8" style="background:#FCF" |Walked (Day 5)
|-
! colspan="12" style="background:#000" |
|-
! Notes
| 1| 2| colspan="3" | none| 3| 
| 
| 
|}

Notes

 : Three days before the show's launch, voting opened for the public to decide the first couplings of the series. As the first bombshell, Davide was not eligible to be chosen in the public vote. Instead, he was able to steal a girl for himself on Day 2. He chose Gemma, leaving Liam single.
 : On Day 8, new boy Jacques was able to couple up with one of the two single girls, Afia and Paige. He chose Paige.
 : Original Islanders were only given the option to remain in their current couple, or re-couple with one of the new Islanders.

Weekly summary
The main events in the Love Island'' villa are summarised in the table below.

Ratings
Official ratings are taken from BARB. Because the Saturday episodes are "Unseen Bits" episodes rather than nightly highlights, these are not included in the overall averages. Viewing figures are consolidated 7-day viewing figures with pre-broadcast viewing and viewing on tablets, PCs and smartphones included.

References

2022 British television seasons
Love Island (2015 TV series)
Television shows set in Spain